Nurlan Myrzabayev (born 6 November 1992) is a Kazakhstani taekwondo practitioner. He won one of the bronze medals in the men's 80 kg event at the 2018 Asian Games held in Jakarta, Indonesia.

In 2017, he competed in the men's welterweight event at the World Taekwondo Championships held in Muju County, South Korea. He also competed in the men's −80 kg event at the 2017 Asian Indoor and Martial Arts Games held in Ashgabat, Turkmenistan. In this competition he lost his only match against Erfan Nazemi of Iran. Nazemi went on to win the gold medal in this event.

References

External links 
 

Living people
1992 births
Place of birth missing (living people)
Kazakhstani male taekwondo practitioners
Taekwondo practitioners at the 2018 Asian Games
Medalists at the 2018 Asian Games
Asian Games bronze medalists for Kazakhstan
Asian Games medalists in taekwondo
21st-century Kazakhstani people